Macroptila laniata is a moth of the subfamily Arctiinae. It was described by Paul Dognin in 1899. It is found in Ecuador.

References

 Natural History Museum Lepidoptera generic names catalog

Lithosiini
Moths described in 1899